Darya Maslova (born 6 May 1995) is Kyrgyzstani long-distance runner. She won bronze medals at the 2015 Asian Championships and the 2015 Summer Universiade. She has qualified to represent Kyrgyzstan at the 2020 Summer Olympics in the women's marathon event.

Competition record

Personal bests
Outdoor
800 metres –2:10.7 (Bishkek 2017)
1500 metres – 4:24.61 (Bishkek 2015)
3000 metres – 9:16.23 (Taipei City 2014)
5000 metres – 15:00.42 (Baku 2017) NR
10,000 metres – 31:36.90 (Rio de Janeiro 2016) NR

References

External links
 

1995 births
Living people
People from Issyk-Kul Region
Kyrgyzstani people of Russian descent
Kyrgyzstani female long-distance runners
Athletes (track and field) at the 2014 Asian Games
Athletes (track and field) at the 2018 Asian Games
Athletes (track and field) at the 2016 Summer Olympics
Athletes (track and field) at the 2020 Summer Olympics
Olympic athletes of Kyrgyzstan
Universiade medalists in athletics (track and field)
Asian Games gold medalists for Kyrgyzstan
Asian Games silver medalists for Kyrgyzstan
Asian Games medalists in athletics (track and field)
Medalists at the 2018 Asian Games
Universiade medalists for Kyrgyzstan
Asian Games gold medalists in athletics (track and field)
Medalists at the 2015 Summer Universiade
Medalists at the 2017 Summer Universiade
Islamic Solidarity Games competitors for Kyrgyzstan
21st-century Kyrgyzstani women